The Susquehanna River, in the Mid-Atlantic States of the United States, has a collection of dams.  These dams are used for power generation, flood control, navigation and recreation.  These dams have local and regional environmental impacts on the river and the Chesapeake Bay, both positive and negative.

Environmental impacts 

And by making it more Susquehanna specific.

The dams have a positive impact on the environment.  They slow water, trapping silt and pollutants.  Conowingo Dam is credited with preventing much of the silt from Pennsylvania from reaching the Chesapeake Bay.  The dam spillways can add oxygen to the water.  The down stream side of dams is favored by aquatic birds, possibly because the fish that pass through the dam are a bit stunned.  Conowingo Dam is noted for its bald eagles.  Hydroelectric power is considered an environmentally friendly method of power generation.

The dams also make a negative impact on the environment.  They raise the water level, altering the riparian environment.  The upstream pools can become environmentally unsound below the surface, especially during summer.  They block migratory fish, such as the American shad.  The dams from York Haven down to the Chesapeake all have fish ladders or lifts to mitigate this.

Human impacts 

And by making it more Susquehanna specific.

The dams have both a positive and negative impact on human society, outside of the environmental impacts above.

River dams have long been associated with power generation.  In the past dams powered mills directly.  Today dams are used both for direct hydroelectric generation and to form pools for cooling other forms of generation.  Dams create navigable stretches of river where they may have been unnavigable before.  The first dams at Sunbury, Pennsylvania were to support year round ferry crossings.

The creation of dams does have negative impacts.  Communities on the river edge are displaced, such as Conowingo, Bald Friar, and Glen Cove, Maryland in 1928.  Longitudinal river navigation is impeded.  Although the historic Susquehanna was very difficult to navigate most of the year.  Timber rafts could come down in the spring high water, but very few boats went up the river, before the canals were built.  The Conowingo Dam is located near "Smith's Falls", where   John Smith had to turn back while exploring the region in the early 17th century due to the impassable rapids.

List of dams 
Listed from the headwaters toward the mouth of the river.  This includes existing and historic structures, as well as dams off the river that have a major impact on the river.  The river also grows its own ice dams during the winter and notable ones will be included.

Northern Branch 
This section may be incomplete.

New York
 Natural geologic formation at Cooperstown that forms Otsego Lake,  the headwaters of the Susquehanna.
 Mill St. Bridge Dam at Cooperstown
 Power generating dam at Goodyear Lake, Colliers Dam (Colliersville, NY). The dam creates a small lake used for motor boating and waterskiing.
 Southside Oneonta Dam
 Rockbottom Dam
 partial dam just above confluence of Chenango River
 Binghamton dam (low head)
 Johnson City Goudy Station Power Plant Dam

Pennsylvania
Oakland Dam (Dam is structurally deficient and has a 45-foot hole in it)
 Wilkes-Barre Dam (proposed, inflatable)
 Nanticoke Dam (former canal feeder) 1830-1901
 Nanticoke Dam (proposed, inflatable)

West Branch

Pennsylvania
Curwensville Dam
Shawville Dam (low head)
Lock Haven Dam (low head)
Williamsport Dam (low head)

Lower Susquehanna

Pennsylvania 
Shamokin Dam (original low head navigation and canal feeder) (18??-1904, replaced by Bower Dam)
Adam T. Bower Memorial Dam near Sunbury, Pennsylvania
Shamokin Dam power plant low head dam
Clarks Ferry Dam (former canal feeder) near Duncannon, Pennsylvania
Dock Street Dam (low head) in Harrisburg, Pennsylvania (replacement planning under way)
York Haven Dam
Wrightsville Dam (low head, former canal feeder, demolished)
Safe Harbor Dam
Holtwood Dam
Muddy Run Pumped Storage Facility (draws from and flows into the Conowingo Reservoir (river))

Maryland 
Conowingo Dam

References 

Susquehanna River
Susquehanna River
Susquehanna
Susquehanna
Susquehanna
Susquehanna
Susquehanna
Susquehanna
Susquehanna